Moroccan Crisis could refer to:

 The First Moroccan Crisis, also called the Tangier Crisis, brought about by the visit of Kaiser Wilhelm II to Tangier in Morocco on March 31, 1905

 The Agadir Crisis, also called the Second Moroccan Crisis, sparked by the deployment of a German warship to the Moroccan port of Agadir on July 1, 1911